Hannah Sullivan (born 3 January 1979) is a British academic and poet. She is the author of The Work of Revision (Harvard University Press, 2013), which won the Rose Mary Crawshay Prize and the University English Book Prize, as well as the poetry collection Three Poems (Faber, 2018), which won the T. S. Eliot Prize. She is associate professor of English literature at New College, Oxford.

Biography
Sullivan attended Trinity College, Cambridge, earning a double starred first in Classics in 2000. She spent a year at Harvard University as a Kennedy Scholar, studying comparative literature, and subsequently obtained a Master of Research (M.Res) in cultural studies at the London Consortium. She returned to Harvard University to work on a PhD in English and American literature, which she received in 2008. She spent four years as an assistant professor of English literature at Stanford University before returning to England.

In 2013, Sullivan published The Work of Revision, an academic study of how revision and rewriting influenced the style of literary modernism, for which she received the 2014 Rose Mary Crawshay Prize and the 2014 University English Book Prize. On the basis of her first book, she was awarded a Philip Leverhulme Prize to write a second book on free verse.

In 2018, she published her first poetry collection, Three Poems (Faber), which won the prestigious T. S. Eliot Prize for the best new poetry collection published in Great Britain or Ireland.

Sullivan is currently an associate professor of English at New College, Oxford. She lives in London with her husband and two children.

Selected publications

Awards and recognition
 
 T. S. Eliot Prize (2018)
 John Pollard Foundation International Poetry Prize (2018) 
 Rose Mary Crawshay Prize (2014)
 Philip Leverhulme Prize (2013)

References

1979 births
21st-century British non-fiction writers
21st-century English poets
21st-century English women writers
Alumni of Trinity College, Cambridge
English women non-fiction writers
English women poets
Harvard University alumni
Kennedy Scholarships
Living people
People educated at Notting Hill & Ealing High School
T. S. Eliot Prize winners
Writers from London